Diaporthe eres is a fungal plant pathogen.

References

Fungal plant pathogens and diseases
eres
Fungi described in 1801